Sydney is an American sitcom television series starring Valerie Bertinelli, Matthew Perry and Craig Bierko that aired on CBS from March 21 to June 25, 1990. It was created and written by Michael J. Wilson and Douglas Wyman. This series marked Valerie Bertnelli's return to a CBS series after One Day at a Time ended back in 1984.

Synopsis
Sydney Kells (Valerie Bertinelli), a private investigator from a family of police officers, relocates her one-woman private detective agency from New York City to her small hometown. There, Sydney struggles to balance her personal and professional life. Her main client is an uptight lawyer, Matt Keating (Craig Bierko), with whom she shares sexual chemistry. Her over-protective brother Billy (Matthew Perry), a rookie officer, tries to help her when he can. Sydney and her best friend Jill (Rebeccah Bush) frequent a neighborhood bar run by Ray (Barney Martin), her father's old police partner.

Cast
Valerie Bertinelli as  Sydney Kells 
Matthew Perry as  Billy Kells 
Craig Bierko as  Matt Keating 
Barney Martin as  Ray 
Rebeccah Bush as  Jill
Perry Anzilotti as  Perry 
Daniel Baldwin as  Cheezy 
Georgia Brown as  Linda Kells

Theme song
Bertinelli convinced then-husband Eddie Van Halen to grant permission for the Van Halen song "Finish What Ya Started", from their 1988 album OU812, to be used as the opening theme song to Sydney.

Guest appearances
Pat Harrington, Jr., who appeared with Bertinelli in the long-running CBS sitcom One Day at a Time, guest starred as a rival private investigator in the seventh episode of the season, which was directed by John Ratzenberger.  Billy Van Zandt and Jane Milmore, who acted as creative consultants on the show, also made various guest appearances.  Chazz Palminteri played Tony in the episode "Love Ya, Babe".  Other guest actors included Yeardley Smith, Kevin Dunn, Annabelle Gurwitch, Tony Longo, Andy Dick and Michael E. Knight.

Episodes

References

External links

1990 American television series debuts
1990 American television series endings
1990s American sitcoms
CBS original programming
English-language television shows
Fictional private investigators
Television shows set in New York City
American detective television series